Senator Heck may refer to:

Homer Heck (1936–2014), West Virginia State Senate
Joe Heck (born 1961), Nevada State Senate
Max W. Heck (1869–1938), Wisconsin State Senate